Harmony is an unincorporated community in Jefferson County, Illinois, United States.

References

Unincorporated communities in Illinois
Unincorporated communities in Jefferson County, Illinois